The 2017–18 Yale Bulldogs men's basketball team represented Yale University during the 2017–18 NCAA Division I men's basketball season. The Bulldogs, led by 19th-year head coach James Jones, played their home games at John J. Lee Amphitheater of the Payne Whitney Gymnasium in New Haven, Connecticut as members of the Ivy League. They finished the season 16–15, 9–5 in Ivy League play to finish in third place. They lost in the semifinals of the Ivy League tournament to Penn.

Previous season
The Bulldogs finished the 2016–17 season 18–11, 10–4 in Ivy League play to finish in third place. In the inaugural Ivy League tournament, they defeated Harvard before losing to Princeton in the championship game.

Offseason

Departures

2017 recruiting class

2018 Recruiting class

Roster

Schedule and results

|-
!colspan=9 style=| Non-conference regular season

|-
!colspan=9 style=| Ivy League regular season

|-
!colspan=9 style=| Ivy League tournament

References

Yale Bulldogs men's basketball seasons
Yale
Yale Bulldogs
Yale Bulldogs